Dihydropyrimidinase-related protein 5 is an enzyme that in humans is encoded by the DPYSL5 gene.

Members of the CRMP family, such as DPYSL5, are believed to play a role in growth cone guidance during neural development.[supplied by OMIM]

References

Further reading

External links